Sergej Pavlovich Newski (Сергей Павлович Невский), born 10 October 1972, is a Russian composer.

Life 
Born in Moscow, Nevsky studied music theory at the Moscow Conservatory. He then continued his studies at the Hochschule für Musik Carl Maria von Weber Dresden with Jörg Herchet and at the Berlin University of the Arts with Friedrich Goldmann. There, he additionally studied music theory and music education with Hartmut Fladt from 2000 to 2005.

Nevsky's music will be performed at the Donaueschinger Musiktages, the Wien Modern, Eclat festivals, among others, MaerzMusik,  and Warsaw Autumn.

He has received commissions from the Konzerthaus Berlin, the Staatsoper Unter den Linden, the Staatstheater Stuttgart, the Opergruppa (for the Bolshoi Theatre), the Klangforum Wien, Deutschlandradio and the Südwestrundfunk. His opera Franziskus premiered at the Bolshoi Theatre Moscow in September 2012. In February 2020, his music theatre Secondhand-Zeit premiered at the Staatsoper Stuttgart.

Awards and scholarships 
 Berliner Kunstpreis (2014).
 Golden Mask (2014).
 Stipendium Villa Aurora in Los Angeles (2014).
 1st prize in the composition competition of the state capital Stuttgart (2006). 
 Deutsche Akademie Casa Baldi (2005).
 Cité internationale des arts Paris (2001/02).

Compositions

Stage work 
 2021 music performance »Die Einfachen«  (stage director and video artist Ilya Shagalov), Stuttgart, Venice, Berlin
 Secondhand-Zeit (2018/19) based on texts from the eponymous novel by Svetlana Alexievich
 Francis (2008-2012) chamber opera in four scenes based on the play "Saint Francis" by Claudius Luenstedt.
 Autland (2008/09) for six soloists and mixed chamber choir

Orchestral work 
 18 Episodes for Orchestra (2018/19)
 Heath (2018) for viola and string orchestra
 Cloud Ground (2015) for violin and Orchestra

Work for ensemble 
 Letter to H. Marx (2018) for baritone and 14 instruments
 Galileo: Messenger (2017) for violin and 14 instruments
 Rules of Love (2012/13) for soprano, low alto and five instrumentalists
 Opening Gesture (2011) for solo violin, five percussionists and chamber orchestra
 Working Surface (2011) for solo percussion, solo piano, solo tuba and three instrumentalists
 Alles (2008) for speaker and eight instrumentalists
 Fluss (2003/05) for voice and ensemble

Vocal work 
 Island (2011). Three pieces for mixed choir, accordion and percussion to Die Nibelungen by Friedrich Hebbel.
 Dolze mio drudo (2010). Scenic cantata for five voices, three brass groups and noise instruments. Alternative scoring: madrigal for five voices and four trombones ad libitum. Text: Friedrich II
 What flee hare and hedgehog.... . (2004) for six voices. Text Einar Schleef
 Generator (2001/02) for four vocal soloists.
 Vray dieu d'amours (2007). for bass and alto voice. Text Matthaeus Pipelare

Chamber music 
 Wut (2013) for flute, cello, percussion and piano
 Tcas' (2011/12) for violin and five strings
 channel surfing (2010) for alto saxophone, accordion and double bass
 String quartet no. 3 (2009)
 blind alphabet (2007) for various instrumentations

References

External links 
 
 
 Biografie und Werkverzeichnis beim Ricordi Verlag
 Gastbeitrag von Sergej Newski in der FAZ: „Russlands neue Seele. Aufstand gegen die Modernisierung“
 Interview auf Deutschlandradio Kultur
 Interview in der nmz
 Interview by the Goethe-Institut

Russian male classical composers
21st-century classical composers
Russian opera composers
1972 births
Living people
Musicians from Moscow
21st-century Russian male musicians